Natural mapping may refer to:
 Canonical map
 Natural transformation in category theory, a branch of abstract mathematics
 Natural mapping (interface design)